Cheapside describes a close triangle of roads in the civil parish of Sunninghill and Ascot and ecclesiastical parish of Sunninghill in the Royal Borough of Windsor and Maidenhead in Berkshire, England which includes a school and had a Methodist chapel. It is a cluster of houses, bungalows and cottages with small gardens for the county which contrasts with large houses with large gardens and small farms covering most of the rest of Sunninghill.  It is marked on maps as the area north and east of Silwood Park and south of Sunninghill Park. Harewood Lodge followed by Titness House to its immediate east are of similar 18th century construction and have sometimes been recorded as in the Cheapside locality.

Geography

The bulk of this neighbourhood of Sunninghill has a less sandy soil, thus a tradition of mixed farming supporting its market hence its name, (the Anglo-Saxon word for a market is a "cheap" as in Cheapside, London); alternatively it may have been an area set aside by the Royal landowners as labourers' cottages and considered therefore the "cheap side". It is throughout at lower altitude than the mainly 18th century built-up village south of the church forming the heart of Sunninghill. In the south-east it has the west shore of Virginia Water Lake.

East is the southern part of Windsor Great Park which has denser pockets of tall trees; Sunninghill has remains of its forest throughout — Sunninghill Park was part of Windsor Forest until King Charles I sold it to Thomas Carey in 1630. The park to the east is used by the Royal Family's peripheral members, who have had their homes in Sunninghill and at Bagshot Park to the south. The area is dotted with artificial feeder ponds or lakes to the Bourne which rises at multiple sources in the area.

Amenities

Primary school

The main public amenity is Cheapside (C of E) primary school, since the mid-20th century, a large building on a 2-acre site, having been directly south historically.

Public house
The Thatched Tavern dates to at least the late 17th century and is Grade II listed. It is advertised as a "beautiful 400 year old beamed tavern, with its cosy bar and glowing fires"

Church in Sunninghill

The area has for more than eight centuries been a neighbourhood in the north of the Anglican parish of Sunninghill. Its church replaced a forerunner on the site (about half a mile south of Cheapside) built in about 1120 and may have had earlier predecessors.

Notable people

In the mansions next to Cheapside:
Luke White, 2nd Baron Annaly, politician and army officer lived at Titness Park.
William Hurt, actor, lived at The Dairy House.
Prince Andrew, Duke of York lived at Sunninghill Park.

References

External links

Hamlets in Berkshire
Royal Borough of Windsor and Maidenhead
Sunninghill and Ascot